Alan Roderick Haig-Brown DSO (6 September 1877 – 25 March 1918) was a British Army officer and author who served as commander of the Lancing Officers' Training Corps and later fought in the First World War. He was also an amateur football outside right and played in the Football League for Clapton Orient.

Early life
Haig-Brown was the son of William Haig Brown, headmaster of Charterhouse School, where he was born on 6 September 1877. His elder sister was the headteacher Rosalind Brown. After attending the Dragon School and Charterhouse School, Haig-Brown matriculated at Pembroke College, Cambridge in 1896 and graduated with a B.A. in Classical Tripos in 1899. He was awarded a blue in 1898 and 1899. In 1899, Haig-Brown was appointed Assistant Master at Lancing College.

Army career 
Haig-Brown's army career began at Lancing College in 1906, as a lieutenant in the Lancing Officers' Training Corps and by the end of the year, he had been promoted to captain. In 1908, his commission was transferred to the Territorial Army. Haig-Brown commanded the Lancing Officers' Training Corps until 1915, by which time the British Army was fighting in the First World War. On 1 January 1916, he was transferred to the 23rd Battalion of the Middlesex Regiment on 1 January 1916, promoted to major and appointed second-in-command of the battalion. Haig-Brown was appointed a temporary lieutenant colonel in September 1916 and given command of the battalion.

Haig-Brown saw active service on the Western and Italian fronts between 1916 and 1918, was mentioned in dispatches twice and awarded the Distinguished Service Order. He was killed by machine-gun fire whilst conducting a rear guard action on the Bapaume-Sapignies road, France on 25 March 1918, the first day of the German spring offensive. Haig-Brown was buried Achiet-le-Grand Communal Cemetery Extension.

Author 
Haig-Brown authored three books, Sporting Sonnets: And Other Verses (1903), My Game Book (1913) and The O. T. C. and the Great War (1915).

Personal life 
Haig-Brown had a wife, a son (Roderick Haig-Brown) and two daughters.

Career statistics

References

1877 births
1918 deaths
People from Godalming
English footballers
English Football League players
Association football outside forwards
British Army personnel of World War I
Middlesex Regiment officers
British military personnel killed in World War I
Officers' Training Corps officers
Old Carthusians F.C. players
Cambridge University A.F.C. players
People educated at Charterhouse School
People educated at The Dragon School
Alumni of Pembroke College, Cambridge
Corinthian F.C. players
Tottenham Hotspur F.C. players
Worthing F.C. players
Brighton & Hove Albion F.C. players
Leyton Orient F.C. players
Southern Football League players
Shoreham F.C. players
Companions of the Distinguished Service Order
Military personnel from Surrey